The Public Libraries and Museums Act 1964 (c 75) is an act of the United Kingdom Parliament. It created a statutory duty for local authorities in England and Wales "to provide a comprehensive and efficient library service for all persons". It also allowed local authorities to "provide and maintain museums and art galleries".

Background
The Act was based on research including the Bourdillon Report (1962) which set out the resources which would be required to provide a comprehensive service.

References

United Kingdom Acts of Parliament 1964
Acts of the Parliament of the United Kingdom concerning museums
Library history
Libraries in the United Kingdom